Joseph Mycock (17 January 1916 – 30 May 2004) was an English rugby union player who once captained the England national team. At club level he represented Sale.

Playing career
Mycock captained Sale Rugby Club on 29 May 1936. Mycock said one of his principal aims would be to strengthen the junior teams and try to bring on the clubs own players. He joined Harlequins on 5 December 1936. He was first selected for England on 7 January 1939/ playing at Number 8.

He was later capped for England against the 1947 Australia tourists. It is suggested that he was the first captain to remove forwards from the line out and put them in the backs. On 11 November 1944 he captained the Combined Services.

Notes

1916 births
2004 deaths
Barbarian F.C. players
England international rugby union players
English rugby union players
Harlequin F.C. players
Lancashire County RFU players
People educated at Giggleswick School
Royal Air Force personnel of World War II
Rugby union players from Bakewell
Sale Sharks players
Rugby union locks
Rugby union number eights